Martinian (died in 325) was Roman emperor from July to September 324. He was raised to the purple by the emperor Licinius, whom he had hitherto served as a senior bureaucrat, during Licinius's civil war against the emperor Constantine I. Constantine defeated both emperors and forced them to abdicate, and executed them after initially showing leniency.

Name

Martinian's full name is ultimately unattested, as it is given in abbreviated form on his coins. The name Mar(...), which precedes his common name, probably stands for the nomen "Marcius", or possibly the cognomen Martinus. The letter S in one collection of coins has been interpreted as the forename "Sextus", but some modern authors think it's simply, along with the letter C, an abbreviation of the imperial title "Caesar".

Elevation
In 324, as the second civil war between Licinius and Constantine I was at its height, the situation for Licinius was not promising. Following his defeat at the Battle of Adrianople, he decided to replace Constantine (in name only) as western Augustus. As his replacement he named Martinian co-emperor, as he had previously appointed Valens during his earlier war with Constantine. Prior to his elevation, which took place some time after the battle of Adrianople, Martinian was serving as magister officiorum at Licinius' court. Licinius lacked the aid of a loyal deputy that Constantine possessed in the person of his eldest son Crispus; Licinius appointed Martinian, though not a relative, to make up this deficiency.

Military activities
In the wake of his defeat at Adrianople Licinius sent Martinian, with an army including Visigothic auxiliaries, to Lampsacus (on the Asiatic shore of the Hellespont or Dardanelles) to prevent Constantine from using his fleet to effect a crossing from Thrace into Mysia and Bithynia in Asia Minor. A naval battle in the Hellespont resulted in the destruction of Licinius' navy by Constantine's son Crispus. Following this defeat, Licinius withdrew his forces from Byzantium, which was being besieged by Constantine, to Chalcedon on the Asiatic shore of the Bosphoros. Constantine then crossed the Bosphoros to Asia Minor, using a flotilla of light transports he had built independently from his main fleet on the Hellespont, in order to evade the forces of Martinian. Licinius recalled Martinian from Lampsacus to reinforce his main army. It is not clear whether Martinian's forces reached Licinius before September 18 when Licinius was defeated for the last time at the Battle of Chrysopolis.

Fate
Due to the intervention of Flavia Julia Constantia, Constantine's sister and also  Licinius' wife, both Licinius and Martinian were initially spared, Licinius being imprisoned in Thessalonica, Martinian in Cappadocia; however, Constantine seems to have soon regretted his leniency as both former emperors were subsequently executed. Martinian was probably executed in the spring of 325, in Cappadocia.

Notes

References 
 DiMaio, Michael, "Licinius (308 – 324 A.D.)", DIR (1997).
Grant, Michael (1985), The Roman Emperors: A biographical Guide to the Rulers of Imperial Rome 31 BC-AD 476, London. 
Grant, Michael (1993), The Emperor Constantine, London. 
 Jones, A.H.M., Martindale, J.R. The Prosopography of the Later Roman Empire, Vol. I: AD260-395, Cambridge University Press, 1971
Lenski, Noel E. (2011) The Cambridge Companion to the Age of Constantine, Cambridge University Press.  
Odahl, C.M., (2004) Constantine and the Christian Empire, Routledge 2004. 

325 deaths
4th-century executions
4th-century murdered monarchs
4th-century Roman emperors
Executed Roman emperors
Magistri officiorum
People executed by the Roman Empire
Tetrarchy
Year of birth unknown